Aşağı Astanlı (also, Ashagy Astanly and Nizhniye Astanly) is a village and municipality in the Yardymli Rayon of Azerbaijan.  It has a population of 890.  The municipality consists of the villages of Aşağı Astanlı, Astanlı, and Musa.

References 

Populated places in Yardimli District